Henry M. Rimisho (born 1969) is a Tanzanian Architect and Lecturer from the Department of Architecture, School of Architecture, Construction, Economics and Management at Ardhi University in Dar es Salaam. He is also a Missionary priest from the Congregation of The Apostles of Jesus based in Nairobi, Kenya.

Biography
Rimisho was born in Kinondoni, Dar es Salaam in the United Republic of Tanzania, to Mr. and Mrs. Jacob Rimisho. In 1994, he attended Pontifical Urban University for (Bachelor's degree) in Philosophy and 2000 he attained (Bachelor's degree) in Theology. From 2012 he also attained (Bachelor's degree), in 2014 (Master's degree) and 2020 Doctoral (PhD) in Architecture from Ardhi University. Henry Rimisho is a member of Architects Association of Tanzania and lectures mostly in urban development and housing, architectural design studio, building materials, profession practice, building service and research methodology.

Selected works

External links

References

1969 births
Living people
Tanzanian Roman Catholics
Tanzanian educators
Pontifical Urban University